Wudaoshui Township is an urban town in Sangzhi County, Zhangjiajie, Hunan Province, China.

Administrative division
The town is divided into 10 villages and 2 community, the following areas: Wangjiaping Community, Tuanbao Community, Lianjiawan Village, Huayuquan Village, Chayuan Village, Chaye Village, Kuzhuba Village, Chajiaoxi Village, Yuanbaoxi Village, Wufengshan Village, Tuxidong Village, and Gaojiaping Village (汪家坪社区、团包社区、连家湾村、花渔泉村、茶元村、茶叶村、苦竹坝村、岔角溪村、元宝溪村、五峰山村、土溪洞村、高家平村).

References

External links

Divisions of Sangzhi County